The Hôtel de Klinglin, currently known as the Hôtel du Préfet, is a historic building located near Place Broglie on the Grande Île in the city center of Strasbourg, in the French department of the Bas-Rhin. It has been classified as a Monument historique since 1970.

The Hôtel de Klinglin currently serves as the residence of the prefect of the department of Bas-Rhin.

History
This grand hôtel particulier, of a different design than most in Strasbourg (featuring a straight and a crescent-shaped façade instead of two straight ones), was built between 1732 and 1736 for the royal moneylender (prêteur royal) François-Joseph de Klinglin (1686–1753). The architects were Jean-Pierre Pflug and Joseph Massol.

After Klinglin's disgrace and imprisonment in 1752, the hôtel became the seat of the royal Intendancy of Alsace, which it remained until the French Revolution. Between 1789 and 1799, it was used as the seat of the Directoire du district and since 1800, it has served as the residency of the prefect of Bas-Rhin, with two intervals: between 1871 and 1918, it housed the Statthalter (governor) of Alsace-Lorraine and between 1940 and 1944, the Gauleiter.

During the Siege of Strasbourg in 1870, the hôtel was heavily damaged by Prussian artillery: the exterior walls withstood but the roof collapsed and almost all the interiors were destroyed. It was rapidly rebuilt and refurnished using as much original material as possible; only the shape of the roof was modified and a balcony added.

The Hôtel du préfet is not open for tourists apart on special days such as European Heritage Days.

Gallery

References

External links

Hôtel du préfet - 2 place du Petit Broglie on archi-wiki.org

Literature
Recht, Roland; Foessel, Georges; Klein, Jean-Pierre: Connaître Strasbourg, 1988, pages 121–124

See also
Palais Rohan
Hôtel de Hanau
Hôtel des Deux-Ponts
Hôtel du grand doyenné

18th-century architecture
Monuments historiques of Strasbourg
Buildings and structures completed in 1736
Baroque buildings in France
Hôtels particuliers in Strasbourg
1736 establishments in Europe
18th-century architecture in France